The 1992–93 BBL season was the sixth season of the British Basketball League (known as the Carlsberg League for sponsorship reasons) since its establishment in 1987. The first division featuring a total of 12 teams, playing 33 games each increased in number by one following the admittance of the Oldham Celtics. The Kingston Kings moved from the Tolworth Leisure Centre to new home in Guildford at the Spectrum Arena and became the Guildford Kings.

Worthing Bears were the dominant force in the regular season and sustained their momentum in the post-season Play-off, claiming silverware in both competitions. Their closest rivals were Thames Valley Tigers, who had to settle for second place but were able to enjoy some glory by lifting the League Trophy following a win in the final over the Guildford Kings.

Carlsberg League Division One (Tier 1)

Final standings

The play-offs

Quarter-finals 
(1) Worthing Bears vs. (8) Leicester City Riders

(2) Thames Valley Tigers vs. (7) Oldham Celtics

(3) London Towers vs. (6) Derby Bucks

(4) Guildford Kings vs. (5) Birmingham Bullets

Semi-finals

Final

National League Division 2 (Tier 2)

Final standings

National League Division 3 (Tier 3)

Final standings

National Cup

Third round

Quarter-finals

Semi-finals

Final

NatWest Trophy

Group stage 
North Group 1
North Group 2
South Group 1
South Group 2

Semi-finals 
Derby Bucks vs. Guildford Kings

Leicester City Riders vs. Thames Valley Tigers

Final

Seasonal awards 
 Most Valuable Player: Colin Irish (Worthing Bears)
 Coach of the Year: Mick Bett (Thames Valley Tigers)
 All-Star Team:
 Trevor Gordon (Guildford Kings)
 Colin Irish (Worthing Bears)
 Cleave Lewis (Worthing Bears)
 Nigel Lloyd (Thames Valley Tigers)
 Joel Moore (London Towers)
 Derek Rucker (Birmingham Bullets)
 Peter Scantlebury (London Towers)
 Billy Singleton (Birmingham Bullets)
 Tyrone Thomas (Cheshire Jets)
 Gene Waldron (Leicester City Riders)

References 

British Basketball League seasons
1
British